James Henry Gardner (May 21, 1881 – November 6, 1940) was a Canadian ice hockey player and coach. Gardner started his career as professionalism was just starting in ice hockey. He won championships with both amateur and professional teams. After his hockey career ended, Gardner coached professionally, most notably with the Montreal Canadiens of the National Hockey Association (NHA). Gardner helped found the NHA, the predecessor of today's National Hockey League, and the Canadiens, including suggesting the team name.

Hockey career

Gardner's playing career started with Montreal Hockey Club amateur men's team of the Canadian Amateur Hockey League in  1900, where he played until 1903, winning the Stanley Cup twice, in 1902 and 1903 as one of the 'Little Men of Iron'. In 1903, the players of the Montreal Hockey Club left to form the new  Montreal Wanderers of the Federal Amateur Hockey League (FAHL).

After one season with the Wanderers, Gardner then turned professional, playing two years for US teams the Calumet Miners and the Pittsburgh Professionals before returning to Canada and the Montreal Shamrocks. He would return to the Wanderers in 1908 and play for the club until 1911, winning the Cup in 1908 and 1910. He joined the new PCHA and played for New Westminster for two seasons, before returning to Montreal to play for the Montreal Canadiens for two seasons before retiring as a player.

Gardner then coached the Canadiens for two seasons and in later years coached the Hamilton Tigers, Providence Reds, and teams in the Western Canada Hockey League and Quebec Hockey League.

Gardner is credited with helping to found the Montreal Canadiens in 1909, including its name. As an official of the Wanderers, he met with Ambrose O'Brien during the hockey meetings of December 1909, when the Wanderers and O'Brien's teams were left out of a new professional league. Gardner and O'Brien together worked on the idea of the new National Hockey Association, and the idea of a new francophone team for Montreal, to be named "Les Canadiens". The club would be a natural rival for the anglophone Wanderers. O'Brien, whose family controlled railway and mining business, underwrote both the new league and the Canadiens franchise. A month later, the rival league folded and O'Brien's teams absorbed some of the rival teams. O'Brien would sell the Canadiens one year later to George Kennedy, who owned Club Athletique Canadien.

Gardner died in Montreal on November 6, 1940 after a lengthy illness.

He was inducted posthumously into the Hockey Hall of Fame in 1963.

Career statistics

Player statistics

* Stanley Cup Champion.

Coaching record

References

General

External links
 

1881 births
1940 deaths
Anglophone Quebec people
Calumet Miners players
Canadian ice hockey coaches
Canadian ice hockey forwards
Hockey Hall of Fame inductees
Ice hockey people from Montreal
Montreal Canadiens (NHA) players
Montreal Canadiens coaches
Montreal Hockey Club players
Montreal Wanderers (NHA) players
Montreal Wanderers players
New Westminster Royals players
Montreal Shamrocks players
Pittsburgh Professionals players
Stanley Cup champions